Charles Alexander Crickitt (12 January 1736 – 16 January 1803) was an English banker and politician. He was a Member of Parliament for Ipswich from 1784 until his death in 1803.

Crickitt started his banking career in Colchester in 1774, and set up the bank Crickitt, Truelove & Kerridge with William Truelove and J. Kerridge in 1786 in Ipswich. This was the "Blue" bank, linked to the Ipswich Blue Party.

On 29 June 1789 he fought a duel with Nicholas Corsellis in Lexden Heath. The duel arose following an incident the previous Saturday in which Reverend Corsellis had used severe language. Neither party was injured.

He was godson to the Lord Commissioner of the Admiralty Bamber Gascoyne.

References

1736 births
1803 deaths
Members of the Parliament of Great Britain for Ipswich
Members of the Parliament of the United Kingdom for Ipswich
British MPs 1784–1790
British MPs 1790–1796
British MPs 1796–1800
UK MPs 1801–1802
UK MPs 1802–1806
People from Chipping Ongar
English bankers